Roger Melin (born April 25, 1956) is a Swedish ice hockey coach and former player who most recently served as head coach of Leksands IF of the SHL. He has also previously coached SHL clubs Brynäs IF, Färjestad BK, Frölunda HC, AIK and Linköping HC, as well as Hammarby IF and Rögle BK in the Swedish second-tier league. His playing career included five seasons in the Elitserien, with AIK, Örebro IK, and Hammarby, as well as several seasons in the second and third tiers with Väsby IK. His brief stint in North America during the 1980–81 and 1981–82 seasons was mostly spent in the Central Hockey League, though he also played 3 National Hockey League games with the Minnesota North Stars

He has been named Swedish ice hockey's Coach of the Year (Årets coach) on two occasions, first following Brynäs IF's Swedish championship title in 1999, and later for coaching AIK to the semifinals in 2011 in their first season after being promoted to Elitserien.

Playing career
Melin began playing A-level ice hockey in 1973, at the age of 16, with Swedish club Väsby IK in Division 2. In his first year, he played 16 games, getting 10 points (2 goals, 8 assists). After playing 3 years with Väsby, Melin joined AIK in the Elitserien for the 1975–76 season, playing 5 games without scoring. The following year, Melin joined Örebro IK, where he would play for another 3 years, getting 34 points in 65 games. In 1979, Melin rejoined Väsby, getting 45 points (28 goals, 17 assists) in 36 games.

In the 1980–81 season, Melin moved to North America, signing a contract with the Minnesota North Stars of the NHL. That year, he scored a goal and an assist in 9 games with Minnesota's CHL affiliate, the Oklahoma City Stars, while also playing one game with Minnesota in the NHL.  The following season, Melin remained scoreless in the two games he played with Minnesota, while scoring 45 points (18 goals, 27 assists) in 77 games with the CHL's Nashville South Stars.

In 1982, after 2 years in North America, Melin returned to Sweden, having never adapted to North American style of play. He would play 3 years with Hammarby IF, scoring 67 points in 88 games. In 1985, he retired as a player.

In 1987–88, when Melin was coach of Enköpings SK of the Swedish division 2, he made a brief comeback, playing 7 games, and getting 11 points (4 goals, 7 assists).

Career statistics

Regular season and playoffs

References

External links
 

1956 births
Living people
AIK IF players
Hammarby Hockey (1921–2008) players
Minnesota North Stars players
Oklahoma City Stars players
Örebro IK players
People from Enköping Municipality
Undrafted National Hockey League players
Swedish ice hockey centres
Swedish ice hockey coaches
Sportspeople from Uppsala County